Critical radius is the minimum particle size from which an aggregate is thermodynamically stable. In other words, it is the lowest radius formed by atoms or molecules clustering together (in a gas, liquid or solid matrix) before a new phase inclusion (a bubble, a droplet or a solid particle) is viable and begins to grow. Formation of such stable nuclei is called nucleation.

At the beginning of the nucleation process, the system finds itself in an initial phase. Afterwards, the formation of aggregates or clusters  from the new phase occurs gradually and randomly at the nanoscale. Subsequently, if the process is feasible, the nucleus is formed. Notice that the formation of aggregates is conceivable under specific conditions. When these conditions are not satisfied, a rapid creation-annihilation of aggregates takes place and the nucleation and posterior crystal growth process does not happen.

In precipitation  models, nucleation is generally a prelude to models of the crystal growth process. Sometimes precipitation is rate-limited by the nucleation process. An example would be when someone takes a cup of superheated water from a microwave and, when jiggling it with a spoon or against the wall of the cup, heterogeneous nucleation occurs and most of water particles convert into steam.

If the change in phase forms a crystalline solid in a liquid matrix, the atoms might then form a dendrite. The crystal growth continues in three dimensions, the atoms attaching themselves in certain preferred directions, usually along the axes of a crystal, forming a characteristic tree-like structure of a dendrite.

Mathematical derivation 
The critical radius of a system can be determined from its Gibbs free energy.

It has two components, the volume energy  and the surface energy . The first one describes how probable it is to have a phase change and the second one is the amount of energy needed to create an interface. 

where  is the Gibbs free energy per volume and obeys . It is defined as the energy difference between one system at a certain temperature and the same system at the fusion temperature and it depends on pressure, the number of particles and temperature:  . For a low temperature, far from the fusion point, this energy is big (it is more difficult to change the phase) and for a temperature close to the fusion point it is small (the system will tend to change its phase). 

Regarding  and considering spherical particles, its mathematical expression is given by:

 

where  is the surface tension we need to break to create a nucleus.

The total Gibbs free energy is therefore:

The critical radius  is found by optimization, setting the derivative of  equal to zero.

yielding

,

The Gibbs free energy of nuclear formation is found replacing the critical radius expression in the general formula.

Interpretation 
When the Gibbs free energy change is positive, the nucleation process will not be prosperous. The nanoparticle radius is small, the surface term prevails the volume term . Contrary, if the variation rate is negative, it will be thermodynamically stable. The size of the cluster surpasses the critical radius. In this occasion, the volum term overcomes the superficial term .

From the expression of the critical radius, as the Gibbs volume energy increases, the critical radius will decrease and hence, it will be easier achieving the formation of nuclei and begin the crystallization process.

Methods for reducing the critical radius

Supercooling 
In order to decrease the value of the critical radius  and promote nucleation, a supercooling or superheating process may be used.

Supercooling is a phenomenon in which the system's temperature is lowered under the phase transition temperature without the creation of the new phase. Let  be the temperature difference, where  is the phase transition temperature. Let  be the volume Gibbs free energy, enthalpy and entropy respectively. 

When , the system has null Gibbs free energy, so:

 

In general, the following approximations can be done: 

  and  

Consequently:

 

So: 

 

Notice that  and  diminish with an increasing supercooling. Analogously, a mathematical derivation for the superheating can be done.

Supersaturation 
Supersaturation is a phenomenon where the concentration of a solute exceeds the value of the equilibrium concentration.

Defining the supersaturation as  this can be rewritten as

Finally, the critical radius  and the Gibbs free energy of nuclear formation can be obtained as

,

See also
 Nucleation
 Ostwald ripening
 Supercooling
 Superheating

References

N.H.Fletcher, Size Effect in Heterogeneous Nucleation, J.Chem.Phys.29, 1958, 572.
Nguyen T. K. Thanh,* N. Maclean, and S. Mahiddine, Mechanisms of Nucleation and Growth of Nanoparticles in Solution, Chem. Rev. 2014, 114, 15, 7610-7630.

Critical phenomena
Phase transitions